Vacanze di Natale a Cortina is a 2011 Italian comedy film written and directed by Neri Parenti.

The film  features many cameos including Bob Sinclar, Renato Balestra, Edinson Cavani, Prince Emanuele Filiberto, Cesare Prandelli, Mara Venier and Simona Ventura. It grossed $14,847,186 at the Italian box office.

Plot 
During the Christmas holidays, in Cortina d'Ampezzo interweave three stories. The lawyer Covelli discovers that his wife is unfaithful, but in straight lines is not so, but the wife decides to play along. Two poor sellers want to make jealous their relatives peasants who have won the lottery. Finally, a Sicilian hairdresser must assist his master, who must sign a contract with a Russian rich man for the future of electricity in Italy.

Cast 

 Christian De Sica as Roberto Covelli
 Sabrina Ferilli as  Elena Covelli
 Dario Bandiera as  Lando
 Ricky Memphis as Massimo Proietti
  Valeria Graci as  Brunella Proietti
  Katia Follesa as  Wanda
  Giuseppe Giacobazzi as  Andrea
 Ivano Marescotti as  Ugo Brigatti

See also  
 List of Christmas films
 List of Italian films of 2011

References

External links

2011 comedy films
2011 films
2010s Christmas comedy films
Films directed by Neri Parenti
Films scored by Bruno Zambrini
Italian Christmas comedy films
2010s Italian films